The women's individual golf event at the 2020 Summer Olympics took place from 4 to 7 August 2021 at the Kasumigaseki Country Club. 60 golfers from 35 nations competed. Nelly Korda of the United States took gold, Mone Inami of Japan and Lydia Ko of New Zealand tied for second with Inami taking the silver in a sudden-death playoff.

Background
The first Olympic golf tournaments took place at the second modern Games in Paris 1900. Men's and women's events were held. Golf was featured again at the next Games, St. Louis 1904 with men's events (an individual tournament as well as a team event). The 1908 Games in London were also supposed to have a golf competition, but a dispute led to a boycott by all of the host nation's golfers, leaving only a single international competitor and resulting in the cancellation of the event. Golf would disappear from the Olympic programme from then until returning in 2016.

Qualification

Each nation can qualify from one to four golfers based on the World Rankings of 28 June 2021. The top 60 golfers, subject to limits per nation and guarantees for the host and continental representation, are selected. A nation can have three or four golfers if they are all in the top 15 of the rankings; otherwise, each nation is limited to two golfers. One spot is guaranteed for the host nation and five spots are guaranteed to ensure that each Olympic continent has at least one representative.

Competition format

Following the format used when golf was returned to the Olympic programme in 2016, the tournament is a four-round stroke play tournament, with the lowest score over the total 72 holes winning.

Schedule

As with most major stroke play tournaments, the event is held over four days (Wednesday through Saturday) with each golfer playing one round (18 holes) per day.

All times are Japan Standard Time (UTC+9)

Results

First round
Wednesday, 4 August 2021

Madelene Sagström of Sweden shot a 5-under-par 66 to take a one-stroke lead over Aditi Ashok of India and world number one Nelly Korda of the United States. Inbee Park, 2016 gold medalist, was three shots off the lead at 69.

Second round
Thursday, 5 August 2021

Nelly Korda took a four stroke lead after a second round of 62. Korda was 11-under-par after 17 holes but had a double-bogey at the final hole. Aditi Ashok, Nanna Koerstz Madsen and Emily Kristine Pedersen were tied for second place, with first round leader Madelene Sagström a further stroke behind, in fifth place.

Third round
Friday, 6 August 2021

Nelly Korda had a third round of 69 to lead by three strokes from Aditi Ashok, who birdied two of the last four holes. Four players, Hannah Green, Mone Inami, Lydia Ko and Emily Kristine Pedersen, were tied for third place, five behind Korda.

Final round
Saturday, 7 August 2021

Mone Inami beat Lydia Ko in a sudden-death playoff for the silver medal.

The medals for the competition were presented by Odette Assembe-Engoulou, Cameroon; IOC Member, and the medalists' bouquets were presented by Annika Sörenstam, Sweden; IGF President.

References

External links
Tokyo 2020 – Golf – Olympic Schedule & Results 

Women
2020 in women's golf
Women's events at the 2020 Summer Olympics